Joseph McGrath may refer to:

Joe McGrath (Australian footballer) (1911–1968), Australian rules footballer
Joe McGrath (Gaelic games) (?–2013), Irish Gaelic football and hurling coach
Joe McGrath (Canadian football) (born 1980), professional Canadian football player
Joe McGrath (Irish footballer), former New Zealand national football coach
Joseph McGrath (Irish politician) (1888–1966), Irish politician
Joseph McGrath (American politician) (1890–1943), American politician
Joseph McGrath (Australian politician) (1886–1937), Tasmanian politician
Joseph McGrath (film director) (born 1930), Scottish film director
Joseph E. McGrath (1927–2007), American social psychologist
Joseph Francis McGrath (1871–1950), Irish-born American prelate of the Roman Catholic Church